What Is to Be Done? is the English translation of several names and book titles.

In Russian 
Chto delat'? (Russian: Что делать?, lit. What to Do?) may refer to:
 What Is to Be Done?, an 1863 novel by Nikolai Chernyshevsky
 What Is to Be Done?, a 1902 political pamphlet by Vladimir Lenin
 Chto Delat (What Is to Be Done?), an art collective founded in 2003 in Saint Petersburg

Tak chto zhe nam delat'? (Russian: Так что же нам делать?, lit. What Then Shall We Do?) may refer to:
 What Is to Be Done?, an 1883 essay by Leo Tolstoy

In Persian 
 What Should Then Be Done O People of the East, a 1936 book of poetry by Muhammad Iqbal
 '' What is to be done?, a collection of speeches and notes by Ali Shariati about social issues and self-awareness

See also 
 Do what has to be done
 To do
 Todo (disambiguation)